Ferdinando Baldi (19 May 1917 – 12 September 2007) was an Italian film director and screenwriter.

Biography

Baldi was born in Cava de' Tirreni, Salerno, on 19 May 1917. His early film work began in Italy in the early 1950s with films such as Il Prezzo dell'Onore. He directed Orson Welles in the films David and Goliath and The Tartars. Baldi died in Italy on 12 September 2007.

Selected filmography 

Il prezzo dell'onore (1952)
Assi alla ribalta (1954)
David and Goliath (1960)
Duel of Champions (1961)
La spada del Cid (1962)
 Taras Bulba, the Cossack (1962)
Il figlio di Cleopatra  (1964)
Sfida al re di Castiglia (1964)
Suicide Mission to Singapore (1966)
All'ombra delle aquile (1966)
Texas, Adios (1966)
Massacre in the Black Forest (1967)
Io non protesto, io amo (1967)
Rita of the West  (1967)
Hate Thy Neighbor (1968)
Django, Prepare a Coffin (1968)
The Forgotten Pistolero (1969)
Bootleggers (1969)
Blindman (1971)
The Sicilian Connection (1972)
Long Lasting Days (1973)
Carambola! (1974)
 Carambola's Philosophy: In the Right Pocket (1975)
Smooth Velvet, Raw Silk (1976)
Get Mean (1976)
Geometra Primetti selvaggiamente Osvaldo (1976)
 Nine Guests for a Crime (1977)
La compagna di viaggio (1980)
Comin' at Ya! (1981)
Treasure of the Four Crowns (1983)
Warbus (1985)
Un maledetto soldato (1988)
Ten Zan: The Ultimate Mission (1988) (as "Ted Kaplan")

References

External links

1917 births
2007 deaths
Italian film directors
Italian film producers
People from Cava de' Tirreni
20th-century Italian screenwriters
Giallo film directors
German-language film directors
Italian male screenwriters
20th-century Italian male writers